The City Council of Helsinki is the main decision-making organ in the local politics of Helsinki, Finland. The City Council deals with issues such as city planning, schools, health care, and public transport.

The 85-seat Council's members are elected every four years in municipal elections. The seat of the Council is the Helsinki City Hall, which overlooks Market Square in central Helsinki. 
Historically, the center-right National Coalition Party has been the largest player in Helsinki's local politics, with the center-left Social Democratic Party being the second largest.  However, since the 2000 elections, the position of the Social Democrats has been challenged by the Green League, for which Helsinki is the strongest area of support nationally, with the former party becoming the second-largest in only the 2008 elections. As of 2021, the second-largest and third-largest parties in the Council are the Green League and the Social Democrats respectively.

The Left Alliance is the Council's fourth-largest party while the Finns are the fifth-largest. The Swedish People's Party is sixth, with the party's support on a steady decline over the years; this can be attributed to the diminishing proportion of Swedish speakers in Helsinki. The agrarian Centre Party, despite being one of the major parties in national politics, has limited support in Helsinki. This is because there are very few farmers in Helsinki.

Seat distribution in the Council

1919–1936

1945–

Chairmen of the City Council 

 Leo Mechelin (1875–1878)
 A. W. Liljenstrand (1877)
 J. A. Estlander (1879–1880)
 Lorenz Leonard Lindelöf (1881–1882) 
 M. W. af Schultén (1883–1887)
 J. W. Runeberg (1888–1891)
 Leo Mechelin (1892–1899) (2nd time)
 P. K. S. Antell (1900–1903)
 Alfred Norrmén (1904–1918)
 Alexander Frey (1919–1920)
 Arthur Söderholm (1922)
 Leo Ehrnrooth (1923–1925)
 Antti Tulenheimo (1926–1928)
 Ivar Lindfors (1929–1934)
 Yrjö Harvia (1934–1936)
 Eero Rydman (1937–1944)
 Eino Tulenheimo (1945–1950)
 Konsti Järnefelt (1951)
 Lauri Aho (1952–1956)
 Teuvo Aura (1957–1968)
 Jussi Saukkonen (1969–1972)
 Pentti Poukka (1973–1979)
 Gustaf Laurent (1980)
 Harri Holkeri (1981–1987)
 Kari Rahkamo (1987–1991)
 Erkki Heikkonen (1991–1992)
 Arja Alho (1993–1994)
 Suvi Rihtniemi (1995–2000)
 Pekka Sauri (2001–2003)
 Minerva Krohn (2003–2004)
 Rakel Hiltunen (2005–2008)
 Otto Lehtipuu (2009–2011)
 Minerva Krohn (2011–2012)
 Mari Puoskari (2013–)

Deputy Chairman
 
 Väinö Tanner (1929-1930)
 Johan Helo
 Pekka Railo
 Tyyne Leivo-Larsson (1948-1956)
 B. R. Nybergh (1951-1954)
 Gunnar Modeen (1954-1964)
 Yrjö Rantala (1957-1972)
 Leo Backman (1965-1967)
 Carl-Gustaf Londen (1967-1974)
 Keijo Liinamaa (1973-1976)
 Gustaf Laurent (1974-1980)
 Per-Erik Förars (1977-1979)
 Arvo Salo (1979-1980) 
 Grels Teir
 Jyrki Lohi (1989-1992)
 Ulla Gyllenberg (1989-1992)
 Outi Ojala (1993-1994)
 Erkki Heikkonen (1993-1995)
 Ulla Gyllenberg (1994-1998)
 Per-Erik Förars (1995-1996)
 Tuula Haatainen (1997-2000)
 Tuija Brax (1998-2000)
 Hannele Luukkainen (2000)
 Suvi Rihtniemi (2001-2004)
 Arto Bryggare (2001-2004)
 Harry Bogomoloff (2005-)
 Minerva Krohn (2005-2008)
 Rakel Hiltunen (2009–2012)
 Sara Paavolainen (2013–)

City Manager
The City Manager of Helsinki was appointed by the Council. The last holder of the post was Jussi Pajunen. He was appointed for two 7-year terms, starting 1 June 2005. Pajunen was a member of the Council for 8 years, and was the chairman of the city board in 2003–2005.  The position of City Manager was abolished in June 2017 and the position of Mayor was created.

List of city managers of Helsinki

Mayor
The position of Mayor of Helsinki was created when the position of City Manager of Helsinki was abolished in June 2017. The incumbent mayor of Helsinki is Juhana Vartiainen. Vapaavuori has been a Helsinki City Council member in the years 1997-2007 and 2017-. Vapaavuori started his term on 7 June 2017.

List of mayors of Helsinki

See also
 Timeline of Helsinki

References

External links
 

Politics of Helsinki
City councils